This is a list of notable events in country music that took place in the year 1927.

Events 
 July through August – Ralph Peer rents a warehouse in Bristol, Tennessee, for two weeks; the ensuing Bristol sessions produce several hits and introduce Jimmie Rodgers and the Carter Family to America.
 Rodgers makes his first recordings on August 4 for the Victor Talking Machine Company at Bristol, Tennessee, of "The Soldier's Sweetheart" and "Sleep, Baby, Sleep." The latter did well, but "Sleep" drew little interest, until late in 1927, it took off and became his first hit.
 The Carter Family's recordings are also made that month; their first release is the double-sided hit "Wandering Boy" and "Poor Orphan Child."
 November 30 – Jimmie Rodgers participates in his second recording session, recording four sides at Camden, New Jersey: "Ben Dewberry's Final Run," "Mother Was a Lady (If Brother Jack Were Here)," "Blue Yodel ('T' for Texas)," and "Away Out on the Mountain."

Top Hillbilly (Country) Recordings

The following songs were extracted from records included in Joel Whitburn's Pop Memories 1890-1954, record sales reported on the "Discography of American Historical Recordings" website, and other sources as specified. Numerical rankings are approximate, they are only used as a frame of reference.

Top new album releases

Births 
 February 25 – Ralph Stanley, bluegrass pioneer and Grand Ole Opry stalwart (died 2016).
 March 15 – Carl Smith, honky tonk-styled star of the 1950s through 1970s (died 2010).
 July 27 – Charlie Louvin, member of The Louvin Brothers (with brother Ira), and a solo star after their split and Ira's death (died 2011).
 August 12 – Porter Wagoner – enduring Grand Ole Opry star, television host, duet partner of Dolly Parton, singer of hits including "A Satisfied Mind" and "The Carroll County Accident" (died 2007).
 August 17 – E.W. "Bud" Wendell – music executive.
 August 29 – Jimmy C. Newman – Cajun-styled country performer and longtime Grand Ole Opry star (died 2014). 
 September 8 – Harlan Howard – Songwriter of many country music standards from the 1950s through 1980s (died 2002).
 October 2 – Leon Rausch, 91, member of The Texas Playboys (died 2019).
 November 8 – Patti Page, crossover female vocalist best known for "Tennessee Waltz" (died 2013).
 December 30 – Bob Ferguson, record producer and songwriter, best known for work with Porter Wagoner and Dolly Parton (died 2001).

Deaths

Further reading 
 Kingsbury, Paul, "Vinyl Hayride: Country Music Album Covers 1947–1989," Country Music Foundation, 2003
 Millard, Bob, "Country Music: 70 Years of America's Favorite Music," HarperCollins, New York, 1993
 Whitburn, Joel. "Top Country Songs 1944–2005 – 6th Edition." 2005.

References

Country
Country music by year